Shaheed Suhrawardy Medical College (ShSMC) is a public medical college and hospital located in Dhaka, the capital city of Bangladesh.
This medical college is the third public medical college in the government medical college rank after DMC & SSMC. It has been included in the Avicenna Directory of Medical Schools and International Medical Education Directory (IMED).

History 

Shaheed Suhrawardy Hospital was established in 1963 as Ayub Central Hospital in Sher-e-Bangla Nagor, Dhaka, Bangladesh. The hospital building was designed by architect Louis I Kahn.

The Bangladeshi government decided on 5 September 2005 to turn Shaheed Suhrawardy Hospital into a medical college. Educational activities in the college began on 6 May 2006. In the inauguration ceremony the then health minister, Khandakar Mosharof Hossain started the educational activities officially. Originally, the medical college was known as Begum Khaleda Zia Medical College and had 100 students. However, on 1 June 2009, the name of the medical college was changed to Shaheed Suhrawardy Medical College.

The new college building has been inaugurated by the Prime Minister, Sheikh Hasina on 17 January 2012.

Campus
There are separate hostels for boys and girls. Both the hostels were established and opened in June, 2008. Both of the hostels are six storied & have catering services, Hall rooms, bathrooms and lavatory facilities. Canteen facilities are available with food items.
Shaheed Suhrawardy Medical College is affiliated with the University of Dhaka. 
This college is directly governed by Bangladesh Medical and Dental Council BMDC - an affiliate of Ministry of Health.

Academics
The students receive MBBS degree from the University of Dhaka after completion of 5th year of study and passing the final Professional MBBS examination. The students receive BDS degree from the University of Dhaka after completion of 4th year of study and passing the final Professional BDS examination-that is initiated from 2012. Despite of being a relatively new medical college in Bangladesh, this institution has gained the status of one of the best and most deemed medical college of the country. Just after its inception, the college gained enough fame due to the brilliant results of students on the professional exams.

Admission test is held under the Ministry of Health for admission in all the government medical colleges. Students selected in the test are admitted here on the basis of their choice.

Principals 
 1st principal: A.K.M. Azizul Huq (2006-2008)
 2nd principal: Abdul Kader Khan (2008-2009)
 3rd principal: ABM Muksudul Alam (2009 – present)

Extracurricular activities 
Each and every year the students celebrate the national days by performing cultural programme. Also the students celebrate the Iftar Party, Swarasti Puja, Pahela Baisakh, Indoor Games Competition in the college campus. The New Hostel building is provided with modern indoor sports facilities for the upcoming new generation doctors of this very medical college. The college has arranged cultural and sports week for the 2nd time in 2014 and is committed to continue every year. The students celebrate their 30 days, 100 days, year ending, and batch programs on campus.

Voluntary organization 
 Sphuron
 Sandhani, Shaheed Suhrawardy Medical College Unit
 Shaheed Suhrawardy Medical College Debating Club
 de beats 

 Somaz Sheba Protishthan, helping poor patients who can not afford themselves.

Achievements 
After being established as a newest member in medical colleges of Bangladesh Shaheed Suhrawardy Medical College has achieved internal glory in the arena of research both in postgraduate and undergraduate research and conferences. Students have attended European Students conference in 2011, 2012, 2013 as research presenters, workshop participants and ambassador, the AIMS, Lisbon, Portugal in 2012, 2013 as research presenters and ambassador, LIMSC, Netherlands, 2011, 2012 as research presenters, workshop participants and ambassador, KARMIC, India 2012, 2013, research presenter, workshop participant and ambassador. Konference, Kolkata-2012 as workshop participant, research presenter and ambassador and achieved awards and kept the pride and honor of the medical college.
 Awarded "Best Medical College" by NDF (National Debate Federation) festival, 2008 and 2012, 2013  
 Has been included in the Avicenna Directory of Medical Schools (Formerly WHO directory) in May, 2010.
 ShSMCH won 1st prize in the "Top Medical College Hospital" category published by DGHS for the consecutive 3rd time in 2019.
This award is the result of 300 mark assessment by WHO, UKaid, MOHFW & DGHS done all around the year on 4 distinct tools: 1) online measurement 2) onsite monitoring 3) physical assessment & 4) patient satisfaction survey.

Hats off to visionary Director Prof Uttam Kumar Barua and his team for his leadership and guidance to make ShSMCH 'top of the top' again.

Gallery

See also 
 List of medical colleges in Bangladesh

References 

Medical colleges in Bangladesh
Universities and colleges in Dhaka
Hospitals in Dhaka
Educational institutions established in 2006
2006 establishments in Bangladesh